Butyrate response factor 1 is a protein that in humans is encoded by the ZFP36L1 gene.

Function 

This gene is a member of the TIS11 family of early response genes. Family members are induced by various agonists such as the phorbol ester TPA and the polypeptide mitogen EGF. The gene is well conserved across species and has a promoter that contains motifs seen in other early-response genes. The encoded protein contains a distinguishing putative zinc finger domain with a repeating cys-his motif. This RNA binding protein most likely functions in regulating the response to growth factors.

ZFP36L1 can degrade transcripts of numerous components of senescence-associated secretory phenotype (SASP) factors.

Interactions 

ZFP36L1 has been shown to interact with MAPK14.

References

Further reading